"Just Let the Sun" is the second released from Skin's second album Fake Chemical State. Like her previous single, "Alone in My Room", the song was co-written with Paul Draper from Mansun. This was the first single from the album to be available on CD single. The release featured two B-Sides, "Only Vultures" and "Petrol Station Flowers". "Only Vultures" is often used as the opening number to many of Skin's gigs.

Track listing

CD single
 Just Let The Sun
 Only Vultures
 Petrol Station Flowers

Chart positions
United Kingdom: #27 (Indie Chart)
Switzerland: #8
Netherlands: #4
Italy: #9

2006 singles
Skin (musician) songs
Songs written by Paul Draper (musician)
2006 songs
Songs written by Skin (musician)
V2 Records singles